7 Seconds or Seven Seconds may refer to:

 7 Seconds (band), an American hardcore punk band from Reno, Nevada
 7 Seconds (film), a 2005 American crime action thriller film
 "7 Seconds" (song), a song composed by Youssou N'Dour, Neneh Cherry, Cameron McVey and Jonathan Sharp
 "Seven Seconds", a third-season episode of the American police procedural crime drama television series Criminal Minds
 Seven Seconds (TV series), an American crime drama streaming television series

Other
 Seven Second Summits, the second-highest mountains of each of the seven continents